The Taggart GyroBee is an American autogyro that was designed by Ralph E. Taggart of Michigan State University and made available as free documentation. The aircraft is also produced in kit form by Star Bee Gyros of Worcester, Massachusetts for amateur construction.

Design and development
It features a single main rotor, a single-seat open cockpit without a windshield, tricycle landing gear and a twin-cylinder, air-cooled, two-stroke, dual-ignition  Zanzottera MZ 201 engine in pusher configuration.

The aircraft fuselage is made from bolted-together 6061-T6 aluminum tubing.

Variants
Taggart Gyro Bee
Plans-built version introduced in 1990.
Star Bee Light
Kit-built version of the GyroBee, produced by Star Bee Gyros. Mounts a  Sport Copter rotor, Ivoprop propeller and a  Zanzottera MZ 201.
Star Bee Total Bee
Kit-built version of the GyroBee, produced by Star Bee Gyros. Mounts a  Dragon Wings rotor, Ivoprop propeller and a  Zanzottera MZ 202.
Midwest Hornet
Free plans-built version, based on the GyroBee.

Specifications (Star Bee Light)

See also

References

External links

Design documentation
Photos of the Gyro Bee
Photos of Star Bee Gyros

1990s United States sport aircraft
Homebuilt aircraft
Single-engined pusher autogyros
Aircraft first flown in 1990